A smile is a facial expression.

Smile may also refer to:

Computing
 Smile (data interchange format), a binary JSON encoding
 Smile (software), a Macintosh programming and working environment
 SMILE project, a program supported by the Directorate-General for the Environment of the European Commission
 Unicode U+2323 (⌣) SMILE, a symbol in the Miscellaneous Technical Unicode block

Film, theatre, television and radio

Film and theatre
 Smile (1975 film), a film directed by Michael Ritchie
 Smile (2005 film), a film written and directed by Jeffrey Kramer
 Smile (2009 film), an Italian film
 Smile (2022 film), an American horror film
 Smile (musical), a 1986 Broadway musical based on the 1975 film

Television and radio
 Smile (British TV series), a 2002–2007 BBC Sunday morning children's programme
 Smile (Japanese TV series), a 2009 Japanese drama series
 Smile (TV network), a Christian children’s network operated by TBN
 Smile FM, a contemporary Christian radio network
 SmileTV, a range of British television channels

Television episodes
 "Smile" (Boston Legal)
 "Smile" (Doctor Who)
 "Smile" (The Facts of Life)
 "Smile" (Law & Order: Criminal Intent)
 "Smile" (Spin City)
 "Smile" (Water Rats)
 "Smile", an episode of The Good Doctor

Literature
 Smile (comic book), a 2010 graphic novel by Raina Telgemeier
 Smile (Doyle novel), a 2017 novel by Roddy Doyle
 Smile (magazine), a 1998–2002 American magazine aimed at teenage girls
 Smile! (novel), a 2004 children's book by Geraldine McCaughrean

Music

Groups
 The Smile (band), a 2020s English rock band consisting of two Radiohead members and Tom Skinner of Sons of Kemet
 Smile (band), a 1968 London band which was the precursor to Queen
 Smile (American band), a 1990s rock band
 Smile.dk, a Swedish pop band
 Smile, a southern California band that featured Tommy Girvin

Albums
 Smile (Beach Boys album), an unfinished Beach Boys album started in 1966 and abandoned in 1967
 Brian Wilson Presents Smile, a re-recording of the album, 2004
 Smile (Boris album), 2008
 Smile (Cane Hill album), 2016
 Smile (Fiona album), 2008
 Smile (The Idea of North album), 2013
 Smile (Jacky Terrasson album), 2002
 Smile (The Jayhawks album), 2000
 Smile (Katy Perry album), 2020
 Smile (L'Arc-en-Ciel album), 2004
 Smile (Lasgo album), 2009
 Smile (Laura Nyro album), 1976
 Smile (Lyle Lovett album), 2003
 Smile (Mai Kuraki album), 2017
 Smile (Marti Pellow album), 2001
 Smile (Mike Park album), 2011
 Smile (Nina Girado album), 2003
 Smile (The Pillows album), 2001
 Smile (Ride album), 1990
 Smile (Simon Webbe album), 2017
 Smile (Smile.dk album), 1998
 Smile! (Vitas album), or the title song, 2002
 A Smile, by Dappled Cities Fly, 2004
 Smile×Smile, by Mayumi Iizuka, 2003
 Smile, by Hazel O'Connor, 1984
 Smile!, by the Remo Four, 1967
 Smile, by the Yellow Monkey, 1995

EPs
 Smile (EP), by the Wannadies, 1989
 Smile, by Dune Rats, 2013

Songs
 "Smile" (Avril Lavigne song), 2011
 "Smile" (Charlie Chaplin song), 1936
 "Smile" (Dami Im song), 2015
 "Smile" (The Emotions song), 1978
 "Smile" (David Gilmour song), 2006
 "Smile" (G-Unit song), 2004
 "Smile" (James Cottriall song), 2011
 "Smile" (Juice Wrld and the Weeknd song), 2020
 "Smile" (Katy Perry song), 2020
 "Smile" (Lily Allen song), 2006
 "Smile" (Lonestar song), 1999
 "Smile" (R5 song), 2014
 "Smile" (Scarface song), 1997
 "Smile" (Sheila Gordham song), 2015
 "Smile" (Sheppard song), 2014
 "Smile" (Uncle Kracker song), 2009
 "Smile" (Vitamin C song), 1999
 "Smile" (Wizkid song), featuring H.E.R., 2020
 "Smile (Living My Best Life)" or "Smile Bitch", by Lil Duval, 2018
 "Smile", by AFI from The Art of Drowning, 2000
 "Smile", by the Alchemist from Chemical Warfare, 2009
 "Smile", by Band-Maid from Bubble, 2019
 "Smile", by Big Daddy Karsten, competing at Melodi Grand Prix 2021
 "Smile", by Cheap Trick from The Latest, 2009
 "Smile?", by the Crystal Method from Divided by Night, 2009
 "Smile", by DJ Snake from Carte Blanche, 2019
 "Smile", by Edan from Beauty and the Beat, 2005
 "Smile", by the Fall from Perverted by Language, 1983
 "Smile", by Florida Georgia Line from Anything Goes, 2014
 "Smile", by Heavenly from Le Jardin de Heavenly, 1992
 "Smile", by James Marsters from Civilized Man, 2005
 "Smile", by Jamiroquai from Rock Dust Light Star, 2010
 "Smile", by Jay-Z from 4:44, 2017
 "Smile", by Jibbs from Jibbs Featuring Jibbs, 2006
 "Smile", by Kutless from Hearts of the Innocent, 2006
 "Smile", by Luna from Lunapark, 1992
 "Smile", by Maisie Peters from the soundtrack album Birds of Prey: The Album, 2020
 "Smile", by McFly from Radio:Active, 2008
 "Smile", by Nicholas McDonald from In the Arms of an Angel, 2014
 "Smile", by the Nixons from Foma, 1995
 "Smile", by Pearl Jam from No Code, 1996
 "Smile", by Pussycat from First of All, 1976
 "Smile", by Quasi from Field Studies, 1999
 "Smile", by RemyZero from The Golden Hum, 2001
 "Smile", by Rod Wave from Pray 4 Love, 2020
 "Smile", by Shaydee, 2016
 "Smile", by the Story So Far from The Story So Far, 2015
 "Smile", by the Supernaturals from It Doesn't Matter Anymore, 1997
 "Smile", by Tamia from More, 2004
 "Smile", by Taproot from Gift, 2000
 "Smile", by Terri Clark from Roots and Wings, 2011
 "Smile", by Twenty Twenty, 2020
 "Smile", by U2 from U218 Singles, 2006
 "Smile", by Weezer from Weezer, 2001
 "Smile", by Will Powers from Dancing for Mental Health, 1983
 "Smile", by Wolf Alice from Blue Weekend, 2021
 "Smile (Pictures or It Didn't Happen)", by Amanda Palmer from Theatre Is Evil, 2012
 "S.M.I.L.E.", by Psychic TV from Towards Thee Infinite Beat, 1990
 "Smile Song", by Pinkie Pie in My Little Pony: Friendship Is Magic, 2013

Places
 Smile, Kentucky
 Smile, Slovianoserbsk Raion, a village in Ukraine at Luhansk Oblast, near the ground electrode of HVDC Volgograd–Donbass

Other uses
 Small incision lenticule extraction, a form of laser eye surgery
 SmILE, a car designed by Greenpeace
 Smile (actress) (born 1986), Burmese actress
 Smile (bank), a British internet bank
 Smile (horse) (1982–1997), an American Thoroughbred racehorse
 SMILE (spacecraft), Solar wind Magnetosphere Ionosphere Link Explorer, a proposed satellite
 Stanford Mobile Inquiry-based Learning Environment (SMILE), a mobile learning management platform
 XIX Smile, a Swiss paraglider design

See also
 
 
 Smiles (disambiguation)
 Smiler (disambiguation)
 Smiley (disambiguation)
 SMIL (disambiguation)
 The Smile (disambiguation)